Ravana Rajput is an Indian caste. They are among the castes known as Darogas, who claim Kshatriya status.

Origins 

The Ravana Rajputs (known as Darogas) were issues of men from Rajput, Charan, and Oswal communities and their concubines which belonging to various castes. Their descendants were not originally accepted by the Rajput community as Rajputs. They were regarded as the children of the Rajputana princes' from concubines and were household slaves. They served the royal Rajputana families as guards, soldiers and household servants.

In order to raise their status, these people organized themselves into a caste, and styled themselves as "Ravana Rajputs". The British Indian census authorities, however, rejected their claim to the Rajput status.

Present status 

Historically, the Ravana Rajputs have faced caste-based discrimination. The upper-caste Rajputs regard them as inferior, especially for matrimony. Nevertheless, the Ravana Rajputs place themselves highest in the rural caste hierarchy.

According to a 2013 Business Standard report, the Ravana Rajputs form around 7% of the Rajasthan state's population. They have been granted the Other Backward Class status for affirmative action.

In July 2017, the Ravana Rajput community staged a protest against the alleged fake encounter killing of gangster Anandpal Singh, who belonged to their community and was considered a hero in his village. Singh was known for having escalated the Rajput-Jat rivlary, and the agitation following his death united the local Rajput community.

References 

Social groups of India
Social groups of Rajasthan